Treat You Better may refer to:
"Treat You Better" (Shawn Mendes song), 2016
"Treat You Better" (Rüfüs Du Sol song), 2018